The Nathaniel Montgomery House is an historic house at 178 High Street in Pawtucket, Rhode Island.

Background
It is a -story wood-frame structure, five bays wide, with a large central chimney, and a centered entry framed by sidelights and pilasters, and topped by an entablature.  It was built c. 1815, probably by Nathaniel Montgomery, its first owner, as a tenement house, evidenced by the unusual room arrangements in the interior.  It is the oldest known surviving tenement house in the city.

The house was listed on the National Register of Historic Places in 1984.

See also
National Register of Historic Places listings in Pawtucket, Rhode Island

References

Houses completed in 1814
Houses on the National Register of Historic Places in Rhode Island
Houses in Pawtucket, Rhode Island
National Register of Historic Places in Pawtucket, Rhode Island